Little Bay is an 8 ha coastal pond in the country of Sint Maarten on the island of Saint Martin in the Dutch Caribbean. It has a low salinity (4-8 parts per thousand) and lies near the capital, Philipsburg. It has been identified as an Important Bird Area by BirdLife International because it supports threatened or restricted-range bird species. Birds for which the IBA was designated include green-throated caribs, Antillean crested hummingbirds, Caribbean elaenias, pearly-eyed thrashers and lesser Antillean bullfinches. Pied-billed grebes, common moorhens, American coots, white-cheeked pintails and ruddy ducks have been recorded nesting at the site.

References

Important Bird Areas of the Dutch Caribbean
 Natural history of Sint Maarten
Bodies of water of Sint Maarten